Heterodera humuli is a plant pathogenic nematode, the hop cyst nematode. It is an obligate parasite and infests hop plants, Humulus lupulus.

Description 
The male is transparent and vermiform with a body length . The eggs are oval,  and the first two instar larvae are vermiform. The second instar larvae are mobile in damp soil and invade suitable roots. Here they develop further and become sedentary, burying their heads in cells and feeding on the cell sap. The central part of their bodies swells, and after moulting again they develop into bottle-shaped third instar larvae and then thicker lemon-shaped fourth instar larvae. At this stage they either become male or female depending on the food supply. The swollen larval bodies break out of the root and the mobile males travel through the soil while the females remain attached to the root tissues by their heads. After insemination, the females continue feeding and lay eggs. These remain inside the bodies of the females which die and turn into cysts. A single generation lasts 34 to 56 days depending on environmental conditions.

Distribution
The hop cyst nematode occurs in many European countries, the U.S., Canada, South Africa and New Zealand.

Biology
It prefers heavy soils. The main host plant is the hop, Humulus lupulus, but the nematode can also survive in the roots of the stinging nettle, Urtica dioica. Infection with this nematode can lead to a poor quality crop and a decrease in yield of hops of 50%. Mortality in hop cuttings is higher in the presence of this nematode.

In a research study in England, cysts of H. humuli were found in every sample taken in a hop garden. The largest number occurred in the top  of soil but some were found at much greater depths. The numbers of second instar larvae fluctuated in a pattern which indicated that there were probably two or three generations in a growing season, each lasting about six weeks. In moist soil, the second-stage larvae survived for at least fifty four days and were still capable of invading roots and reproducing. It is uncertain how long the eggs remain viable in the cysts but in hatching trials using root diffusates of H. lupulus, Cannabis sativa, Urtica dioica, Urtica urens and Ficus sp., only the diffusate of H. lupulus had any effect on the hatching rate of the larvae.

References

External links 
 Nemaplex, University of California - Heterodera humuli

humuli
Plant pathogenic nematodes
Hop diseases
Nematodes described in 1934